Tri-County Airport may refer to:

 Tri-County Airport (Florida) in Bonifay, Florida, USA (FAA: 1J0)
 Tri-County Airport (Illinois) in Yates City, Illinois, United States (FAA: 2C6)
 Tri-County Airport (North Carolina) in Ahoskie, North Carolina, United States (FAA: ASJ)
 Tri-County Regional Airport in Lone Rock, Wisconsin, United States (FAA: LNR)
 Arcade Tri-County Airport in Arcade, New York, United States (FAA: D23)